Keith Johnson may refer to:

Keith Johnson (cricket administrator) (1894–1972), Australian cricket administrator
Keith Johnson (Australian politician) (1929–1995), Australian politician
Keith Johnson (baseball) (born 1971), former professional baseball player
Keith Johnson (cricketer) (born 1935), South African cricketer
Keith Johnson (actor) (born 1953), African-American actor 
Keith Johnson (author) (born 1938), writer and software developer
Keith Johnson (Paralympic footballer) (born 1980), American Paralympic soccer player
Keith Johnson (sailor) (1897-1960), Singaporean Olympic sailor
 Keith Johnson (applied linguist) (born 1944), British linguist
 Keith Johnson (phonetician), American linguist
Keith Johnson (neurologist), American radiologist
Keith "Wonderboy" Johnson (born 1972), American gospel musician
Keith Johnson (Idaho politician), Idaho state controller, 2002–2007
Keith Johnson (trumpeter), trumpet player with The Butterfield Blues Band

See also
Keith Johnston (disambiguation)
Keith Johnstone (born 1933), drama instructor